This list of Dublin City University faculties, schools, research centres and laboratories  covers the university's diverse and interdisciplinary research interest.

Faculties and Schools

 Faculty of Engineering & Computing
 School of Computing 
 School of Electronic Engineering 
 Faculty of Science & Health
 School of Biotechnology
 School of Chemical Sciences
 School of Health & Human Performance
 School of Mathematical Sciences
 and Human sciences/index.shtml School of Nursing and Human Sciences
 School of Physical Sciences

 DCU Business School (DCUBS)
 Faculty of Humanities & Social Sciences
 School of Applied Language & Intercultural Studies
 School of Communications
 School of Education Studies
 FIONTAR (Business, Communications, Computing, Finance, Journalism and European Languages through Irish)
 School of Law & Government

Research Centres

BDI Biomedical Diagnostics Institute
BEST Biomedical and Environmental Sensor Technology Centre
CBAS Centre for Bioanalytical Sciences
CDVP Centre for Digital Video Processing
CEE Centre for Educational Evaluation
CFDH Centre for Future Diagnostics and Health
CIS Centre for International Studies
CNGL Centre for Next Generation Localisation
City Biologic
CLPR Centre for Laser Plasma Research

CMDE Centre for Modelling with Differential Equations
CSE Centre for Software Engineering
CSSH Centre for Sport Science and Health
CASTeL Centre for the Advancement of Science Teaching and Learning
CTTS Centre for Translation and Textual Studies
CTYI Centre for the Talented Youth of Ireland
CVRC Computer Vision Research Centre (Computer Vision and Medical Imaging)
 
Eeolas Institute at Citywest Business Campus
ExWell Medical (multidisciplinary exercise and sports medicine clinic)
Fighting Blindness Vision Research Institute
 
ICNT International Centre for Neurotherapeutics
Institute for Ethics
Invent Innovation and Enterprise Centre
Irish Association for American Studies
Irish Learning Technology Association
Irish Migration, Race and Social Transformation
Lero, The Irish Software Engineering Research
LInK Leadership, Innovation and Knowledge Research Centre
Maths Learning Centre

National Anti-Bullying Centre
MPRC Materials Processing Research Centre

NCLT National Centre for Language Technology
NCPST National Centre for Plasma Science & Technology
NCSR National Centre for Sensor Research
NCTE National Centre for Technology in Education
NICB National Institute for Cellular Biotechnology

NJLRC National Japanese Language Resource Centre
NTTC National Tennis Training Centre, Albert College Park
Optronics Ireland 
PEI Technologies (Power Electronics)
PlasMAC Centre for Plasma Formation, Measurement and Control
RINCE Research Institute for Networks and Communications Engineering
SCI-SYM Centre for Scientific Computing & Complex Systems Modelling
SIM Centre for Society Information and Media
STeM Centre for Society, Technology & Media
TELTEC (Telecommunications)
The Karl Popper Web
VHRC Vascular Health Research Centre

Laboratories and Research Groups

Adaptive Sensors Group
Advanced Plasma Etch Laboratory (Intel Ireland)
Applied Biochemistry Group
Archport Laboratories
Artificial Life Laboratory
Astrophysics Group

Biocomputation Laboratory
Bioinformatics and Molecular Evolution
Computational Physics Laboratory (Intel Ireland)
CHIME and Jmol Pages  
Control Systems Group
eAccessibility Laboratory
Environmental Flow Modelling Group
EURATOM-DCU (Fusion Power Research Association) 
French Politics and Policy Group
High Performance Negative Ion Source Group
Interoperable Systems Group
LAM Research Laboratory
Machine Translation Group
Machine Vision Group

Microelectronics Research Laboratory
Modelling & Scientific Computing Group
Modelling and Simulation Research Group
Nanomaterials Processing Laboratory
Optical Sensors Laboratory
Patients' rights research Group
Performance Engineering Laboratory

Plasma Research Laboratory
Semiconductor Spectroscopy Laboratory (Ramon)
Surface Science Research Laboratory
Radio and Optical Communications Laboratory
RF Modelling and Simulation Group
Sensors and Separations Group
Speech Group
Switching and Systems Laboratory
Thin Film Materials Research Laboratory
Virtual Communities Group
Virtual Community Projects Laboratory
Virtual Pathology
Virtual Reality Applications Laboratory
Vision Systems Laboratory

Dublin City University
Dublin City University